Ghazal Sadat is an Afghan singer and businesswoman.

Life 
Ghazal Sadat was born in Herat. Her family was forced to leave Afghanistan due to the civil war and went to Turkey. Sadat completed her primary education in Istanbul and lived in Turkey for many years. She went to Montreal where she graduated as a health specialist in dentistry. Sadat is currently trading in Dubai. She has invested in a water company, Mediacal Clinics and also owns four restaurants and cafes in the Jumeirah area in Dubai, and Riyadh and Jeddah in Saudi Arabia   .

References

Living people
Afghan singers
People from Herat
Afghan Tajik people
Afghan women singers
Persian-language singers
Afghan expatriates in the United Arab Emirates
1980 births